Saloum Delta National Park or Parc National du Delta du Saloum in Senegal, is a  national park. Established in 1976, it is situated within the Saloum Delta at the juncture of the Saloum River and the North Atlantic.

The park, which forms part of a UNESCO World Heritage Site and a Ramsar Convention site, lies within a  biosphere reserve. Water comprises  of the park, intertidal mangroves and saltwater vegetation cover , and savannah and forest cover . It lies on the East Atlantic Flyway. The bird species that breed or winter in the area include royal tern, greater flamingo, Eurasian spoonbill, curlew sandpiper, ruddy turnstone, and little stint.

This region represents an important synergy between nature with extensive biodiversity and the way of human development, which is still present, albeit fragile. Sustainable shellfish farming is highly developed here and is a very important source of food and export revenue for the local community and Senegal in general.

Climate change

In 2022, the IPCC Sixth Assessment Report included Saloum Delta National Park in the list of African natural heritage sites which would be threatened by flooding and coastal erosion by the end of the century, but only if climate change followed RCP 8.5, which is the scenario of high and continually increasing greenhouse gas emissions associated with the warming of over 4°C., and is no longer considered very likely. The other, more plausible scenarios result in lower warming levels and consequently lower sea level rise: yet, sea levels would continue to increase for about 10,000 years under all of them. Even if the warming is limited to 1.5°C, global sea level rise is still expected to exceed  after 2000 years (and higher warming levels will see larger increases by then), consequently exceeding 2100 levels of sea level rise under RCP 8.5 (~ with a range of ) well before the year 4000.

See also
Sine River
Sine-Saloum

References

 BirdLife IBA Factsheet - Delta du Saloum. Birdlife International.
 Biosphere Reserve Information - Senegal - DELTA DU SALOUM. UNESCO.
  Parcs et réserves. Government of Senegal.

Ramsar sites in Senegal
National parks of Senegal
Protected areas established in 1976
Serer country